Copper(II) fluoride is an inorganic compound with the chemical formula CuF2. The anhydrous form is a white, ionic, crystalline, hygroscopic solid with a distorted rutile-type crystal structure, similar to other fluorides of chemical formulae MF2 (where M is a metal). The dihydrate, is blue in colour.

Structure
Copper(II) fluoride has a monoclinic crystal structure and cannot achieve a higher-symmetry structure. It forms rectangular prisms with a parallelogram base. Each copper ion has four neighbouring fluoride ions at 1.93 Å separation and two further away at 2.27 Å. This distorted octahedral [4+2] coordination is a consequence of the Jahn–Teller effect in d9 copper(II), and leads to a distorted rutile structure similar to that of chromium(II) fluoride, which is a d4 compound.

Uses
Copper (II) fluoride can be used to make fluorinated aromatic hydrocarbons by reacting with aromatic hydrocarbons in an oxygen-containing atmosphere at temperatures above 450 °C (842 °F). This reaction is simpler than the Sandmeyer reaction, but is only effective in making compounds that can survive at the temperature used. A coupled reaction using oxygen and 2 HF regenerates the copper(II) fluoride, producing water. This method has been proposed as a "greener" method of producing fluoroaromatics since it avoids producing toxic waste products such as ammonium fluoride.

Chemistry

Copper(II) fluoride can be synthesized from copper and fluorine at temperatures of 400 °C (752 °F). It occurs as a direct reaction.

 Cu + F2 → CuF2

It loses fluorine in the molten stage at temperatures above 950 °C (1742 °F).

 2CuF2 → 2CuF + F2

 2CuF → CuF2 + Cu
The complex anions of CuF3−, CuF42− and CuF64−
are formed if CuF2 is exposed to substances containing fluoride ions F−.

Solubility

Copper(II) fluoride is slightly soluble in water, but starts to decompose when it is in hot water, producing basic F− and Cu(OH) ions.

Toxicity
There is little specific information on the toxicity of Copper(II) fluoride.  However, copper and fluoride can both be toxic individually when consumed.

Copper toxicity can affect the skin, eyes, and respiratory tract. Serious conditions include metal fume fever, and hemolysis of red blood cells. Copper can also cause damage to the liver and other major organs.

Metal fluorides are generally safe at low levels and are added to water in many countries to protect against tooth decay. At higher levels they can cause toxic effects ranging from nausea and vomiting to tremors, breathing problems, serious convulsions and even coma. Brain and kidney damage can result. Chronic exposure can cause losses in bone density, weight loss and anorexia.

Hazards

Experiments using copper(II) fluoride should be conducted in a fume hood because metal oxide fumes can occur. The combination of acids with copper(II) fluoride may lead to the production of hydrogen fluoride, which is highly toxic and corrosive.

References

Dierks, S. "Copper Fluoride". http://www.espimetals.com/index.php/msds/537-copper-fluoride (accessed October 9).

External links

National Pollutant Inventory - Copper and compounds fact sheet
National Pollutant Inventory - Fluoride and compounds fact sheet

Fluorides
Metal halides
Copper(II) compounds